The 2021–22 NIFL Premiership (known as the Danske Bank Premiership for sponsorship reasons) was the 14th season of Northern Ireland's highest national football league in this format since its inception in 2008, the 121st season of the Irish League overall, and the ninth season since the creation of the Northern Ireland Football League. The season normally began in early August, however, due to the previous season finishing a few weeks later than usual in late May 2021 as a result of the COVID-19 pandemic in Northern Ireland, the start of this season was pushed back. The 38-game season commenced on 27 August 2021 and concluded on 30 April 2022, with the play-offs taking place during the first two weeks in May 2022.

Linfield were the three-time defending champions, having been league winners in the previous three seasons - the 2020–21 season seeing them win a then world record-equalling 55th league title. This season Linfield once again retained their title, securing a world record 56th league crown on the final day of the season. A 2–0 win over Coleraine meant that the Blues pipped runners-up Cliftonville to the title by a single point. This was the first time in 35 years that a club had won four consecutive titles, with Linfield winning the last of their six consecutive titles in the 1986–87 season. It was also the narrowest title-winning margin since the 2008–09 season, when Glentoran won the title by a single point ahead of Linfield. At the bottom end of the table, Warrenpoint Town were relegated to the NIFL Championship after five years as a Premiership club, with Championship winners Newry City promoted to replace them for the following season. Portadown retained their Premiership status after defeating Annagh United 4–2 on aggregate in the Premiership play-off.

League winners Linfield entered the 2022–23 UEFA Champions League first qualifying round, while Larne (play-off winners) and Crusaders (Irish Cup winners) joined Cliftonville (league runners-up) in the 2022–23 UEFA Europa Conference League first qualifying round.

Teams

Twelve teams competed in the 2021–22 NIFL Premiership, the same twelve teams from the previous season. No relegation took place from the previous season's Premiership, after a majority of second-tier NIFL Championship clubs voted to cancel their 2020–21 season. The second and third tiers had not been granted 'elite' sporting status by the IFA which was required in order to continue playing matches during the COVID-19 pandemic lockdown, with lower division clubs not having played any league fixtures since the 2019–20 season had initially been suspended in March 2020.

Dungannon Swifts finished bottom of the table the previous season, but were reprieved from relegation. Carrick Rangers were also reprieved, having finished in 11th place. This would normally have required them to take part in the NIFL Premiership play-off against the qualifier from the NIFL Championship.

Stadia and locations

League table

Results

Matches 1–22
During matches 1–22 each team played every other team twice (home and away).

Matches 23–33
During matches 23–33 each team played every other team for the third time (either at home, or away).

Matches 34–38
For the final five matches the table was then split into two halves, with teams ranked 1st–6th in Section A and teams ranked 7th–12th in Section B. During matches 34–38 each team played every other team in their respective section once. The fixtures were reversed from those played during rounds 23–33, ensuring that teams had played every other team in their respective section twice at home and twice away overall throughout the season.

Section A

Section B

Play-offs

UEFA Europa Conference League play-offs
Four of the clubs that finished in 3rd–7th place competed for one place in the 2022–23 Europa Conference League first qualifying round, with 4th-placed Crusaders vacating their play-off place as they qualified for Europe directly by winning the Irish Cup. The play-offs were one-off matches with extra time and penalties used to determine the winner if necessary, with the higher-ranked teams given home advantage against the lower-ranked teams (i.e. 3rd v. 7th and 5th v. 6th) in the semi-finals. The higher-ranked of the two semi-final winners also had home advantage in the final.

Semi-finals

Final

NIFL Premiership play-off
The eleventh-placed club, Portadown, faced the second-placed club from the 2021–22 NIFL Championship, Annagh United, for one place in the following season's Premiership.

Portadown won 4–2 on aggregate.

Statistics

Top goalscorers

References

External links

NIFL Premiership seasons
Northern Ireland
2021–22 in Northern Ireland association football